Tai Ping Shan Street is a street marking the early colonial history in Hong Kong. Located at the north slope of Victoria Peak in Sheung Wan, the street starts east from a ladder street at the junction with Bridges Street and end west in Po Yan Street near Tung Wah Hospital. The street runs parallel to Hollywood Road.

Today, Tai Ping Shan Street is well known for its contemporary art, with plenty of pop-up galleries and other specialty retailers offering their wares to shoppers passing by.

History
Tai Ping Shan is an alternative name to Victoria Peak, and literally means "Peace Hill". After the cession of Hong Kong Island from Qing China to the British in the 1840s, British forces made garrison here and later the government relocated all Chinese residents in Choong Wan to the area surrounding Tai Ping Shan Street.

The Chinese writer Wang Tao wrote in 1860 that the street was full of brothels: "gaudy houses, sporting brightly painted doors and windows with fancy curtains".

In May 1894, the bubonic plague, which had been ravaging China, erupted and caused massive deaths in the area during the 1894 Hong Kong plague. The Hong Kong Government soon implemented a series of measures including cleaning of street, demolishing residences to build Blake Garden, and establishing the Bacteriological Institute.

The street's population soared after the Eight-Nation Alliance invasion of China in 1900.

See also
 Description on the plague outbreak in History of Colonial Hong Kong
 Central and Western Heritage Trail
 First Opium War
 List of streets and roads in Hong Kong

References

External links
 
 

Sheung Wan
Roads on Hong Kong Island